Clasp, clasper or CLASP may refer to:
 Wrist clasp, a dressing accessory
 Folding clasp, a device used to close a watch strap
 Medal bar, an element in military decoration
 Fastener, a hardware device that mechanically joins objects together
 CLASP (British Rail), a prefabricated building system
 "Clasp", a song by Jethro Tull from The Broadsword and the Beast
 Clasp, a Common Lisp implementation
 Clasper, an anatomical structure in male cartilaginous fish
 Clasper (mathematics), a surface (with extra structure) in a 3-manifold on which surgery can be performed
 Grasp, holding or seizing firmly with (or as if with) the hand

Acronyms and initialisms

 Center for Law and Social Policy, an American organization, based Washington, D.C., that advocates for policies aimed at improving the lives of low-income people
 CLASP1 and CLASP2, cytoplasmic linker associated proteins
 Classic ASP, a nostalgic term for Active Server Pages in computing
 Collaborative Labeling and Appliance Standards Program (CLASP), an international nonprofit organization
 Consortium of Local Authorities Special Programme, an association in England for the development of prefabricated school buildings